Qipengyuania pelagi  is a Gram-negative, aerobic, rod-shaped, non-spore-forming and non-motile bacteria from the genus Qipengyuania which has been isolated from the Red Sea.

References

Further reading

External links
Type strain of Erythrobacter pelagi at BacDive -  the Bacterial Diversity Metadatabase

Sphingomonadales
Bacteria described in 2012